Tekirova is a town in the District of Kemer, Antalya Province, Turkey.

Large hotels for tourists are established in the town. The base station of the Olympos Aerial Tram is located nearby Tekirova.

References

Populated places in Antalya Province
Kemer District
Towns in Turkey